Mykola Leonidovich Skoryk (born 27 November 1972 in Odesa) is a Ukrainian politician who was Chairman of the Odesa Regional State Administration.

Career
On September 9, 2012 he took part at the Chornomorets football club's ceremony which was held at the newly built football stadium. On December 23, 2013 he congratulated coach Roman Hryhorchuk and the club's general director, Sergei Kernitsky on their championship participation. For that, they awarded him with the black and blue coloured T-shirt with number one on it and some souvenirs. During the same meeting he also praised the team for winning bronze medals back in 1974 and added that he would like to see current "sailors" to join this football club.

On February 25, 2014 he held a meeting in Odesa with various NGO politicians which included such parties as Batkivshchyna, Party of Greens of Ukraine, Rodina, Svoboda, and Youth Unity. On a day prior to it, he addressed to the people of Odesa:In these difficult times it is important to remain calm. We need to do everything we can to Odesa remained peaceful town. As head of the region declare I will act, and acting under Ukrainian law. Encourage supporters and opponents of the authorities also act within the law. I'm in the workplace. In Kharkiv, there are no representatives of the Odesa region. The situation in the Odesa region generally calm and under control. Work all local executive authorities. The situation in the country is difficult. Appeal to public organizations operate in a lawful manner. Otherwise, we get to the point of absurdity.

In the October 2014 Ukrainian parliamentary election Skoryk was elected into parliament; after placing 10th on the electoral list of Opposition Bloc.

In September 2016 Skoryk was suspected of involvement in riots targeting Euromaidan-supporters in Odesa in February 2014.

In the October 2019 Ukrainian parliamentary election Skoryk was reelected into parliament; after placing 16th on the electoral list of Opposition Platform — For Life.

In the 2020 Odesa local election Skoryk was a candidate for mayor of Odesa (nominated by Opposition Platform — For Life). But in the second round of the mayoral election he was defeated by incumbent mayor Gennadiy Trukhanov, 54.28% of the voters voted for Trukhanov.

References

External link

1972 births
Living people
Politicians from Odesa
Odesa National Polytechnic University alumni
Opposition Bloc politicians
Opposition Platform — For Life politicians
Eighth convocation members of the Verkhovna Rada
Ninth convocation members of the Verkhovna Rada
Governors of Odesa Oblast